The two thousand stripling warriors, also known as The Army of Helaman, are an army of young men in the Book of Mormon, first mentioned in the Book of Alma.  They are portrayed as extremely valiant and loyal warriors; in the text, all are wounded in battle and yet survive.

Book of Mormon

Historical roots
The story of the stripling warriors presents a juxtaposition of pacifism and militarism among believers. Four of the sons of Mosiah, including Ammon, were converted miraculously from rebellious youth into believers. Ammon and his brothers embark on a mission to the land of Nephi, and his converts there lay down their lives during attacks by their brethren, which leads to additional conversions. They refuse to take arms due to their conversion.
The missionaries and Lamanite converts migrate to Nephite lands, where they are protected by the Nephite military.

Formation of the unit
The Ammonites (or Anti-Nephi-Lehies) were Lamanites who were converted to Christianity by Ammon, the son of Mosiah. Ammon served a fourteen-year mission among the Lamanites and converted thousands. These people were ferocious and bloodthirsty, and had murdered and plundered not only the Nephites but their own people. Once converted to the gospel of Jesus Christ they buried their weapons of war and covenanted "that they never would use weapons again for the shedding of man’s blood" and "rather than shed the blood of their brethren they would give up their own lives". The remaining unconverted Lamanites began to murder them. When Ammon saw this he moved the Ammonites to a Nephite territory called Jershon so they could be protected by the Nephite army.

When the people of Ammon saw how the Nephite army suffered in defending them, they considered breaking their oath to lay down their weapons and defend themselves; Helaman persuaded them not to break their oath. Two thousand of their sons (who had been too young at the time to have made the covenant) volunteered to fight for the defense of the Nephites and the Ammonites. The young men asked Helaman, the son of Alma the Younger and a leader of the church among the Nephites, to be their commander. The young stripling warriors fought alongside the Nephite army and were one of the Nephites' most effective military units. Though every soldier was wounded at one time or another, there were no fatalities among the warriors. Helaman attributed this to the upbringing provided by their mothers and the great faith they exhibited.

The original 2,000 "sons of Helaman" were later joined by sixty more, making a total of 2,060.

See also
 Helaman
 Ammonites

References

Book of Mormon people
Book of Mormon words and phrases